Fauna of Lithuania may refer to:

 Birds of Lithuania
 Mammals of Lithuania

Spiders
A 2011 list includes 445 spider species.

See also
 Outline of Lithuania

References